Natakala Rayudu is a Telugu-language drama film directed by A. Sanjeevi. It is led by the famous character actor Nagabhushanam.

It is based on the 1951 Hindi film Albela starring Bhagwan.

Plot
Adiseshayya (Nagayya) has two sons and a daughter. His younger son Bujjibabu (Nagabhushanam) likes acting very much. Because of this he loses many jobs shown by his father. Finally they have a big quarrel and Bujjibabu is sent out of his home by his father. His mother blesses him to become a big star. He spends a horrible life without food and is forced to be a domestic worker in the house of Geetha Devi (Kanchana). She identifies the actor in him and gives a chance to act in her company. In spite of resistance from Manager Rajasekhar (Padmanabham) and Hero Prem Kumar (Prabhakar Reddy), he grows to a big star. Geetha Devi loves Bujjibabu. But he concentrates on acting mostly and becomes a big star. After becoming a star, he goes home and finds them facing many problems. Finally he solves their problems and marries Geetha Devi.

Cast

Soundtrack
There are about 10 songs and poems in the film.
 "Chinnavada Vannekada" (Singer: P. Susheela)
 "Droupadi Pancha Bhartruka" (padyam) (Singer: Madhavapeddi Satyam)
 "Idena Neneduru Choochina Prajaswamyam" (Singers: Ghantasala, P. Susheela and group)
 "Nalabhai Ki Debbai Ki Theda Enta" (Singers: Ghantasala, P. B. Srinivas, P. Susheela, B. Vasantha and group)
 "Neelala Kannullo Melamellaga Nidura Ravamma" (Happy) (Singer: P. Susheela)
 "Neelala Kannullo Melamellaga Nidura Ravamma" (Sorrow) (Singer: P. Susheela)
 "O Buchibabu Are O Pichibabu" (Singer: S. P. Balasubrahmanyam)
 "Pattu Panpuna Vennela Parachinatula" (padyam) (Singer: Pithapuram Nageswara Rao and P. Susheela)
 "Rathamu Siddhamu Nee Manorathamu Teerpa" (padyam) (Singer: Pithapuram Nageswara Rao and P. Susheela)
 "Rayuda Na Rayuda Natakala Rayuda" (Singer: Pithapuram Nageswara Rao group)
 "Vela Chooda Vennelaye Lona Chooda Vechanaye" (Singer: P. Susheela)

References

External links
 Natakalarayudu film at IMDb.

1969 films
1960s Telugu-language films
Indian black-and-white films
Films scored by G. K. Venkatesh
Telugu remakes of Hindi films
Indian comedy-drama films